Marathea (before 1957: Βάναρη - Vanari) is a village and a community in the municipal unit of Sellana, Karditsa regional unit, Greece. It is situated in a flat rural area on the right bank of the river Pineios, where cotton is cultivated. It is 9 km southwest of Farkadona, 10 km northwest of Palamas, 19 km northeast of Karditsa and 20 km east of Trikala. In 2011 Marathea had a population of 655 for the village and 901 for the community, which includes the village Korda.

Population

External links
 Marathea on GTP Travel Pages

See also

List of settlements in the Karditsa regional unit

References

Populated places in Karditsa (regional unit)